The mridangam is a percussion instrument of ancient origin. It is the primary rhythmic accompaniment in a Carnatic music ensemble. In Dhrupad, a modified version, the pakhawaj, is the primary percussion instrument. A related instrument is the Kendang, played in Maritime Southeast Asia.

During a percussion ensemble, the mridangam is often accompanied by the ghatam, the kanjira, and the morsing.

Etymology
The word "Mridangam" is formulated by the union (sandhi) of the two Sanskrit words mŗt (clay or earth) and anga (limb), as the earliest versions of the instrument were made of hardened clay.

Legend 
In ancient Hindu sculpture, painting, and mythology, the mridangam is often depicted as the instrument of choice for a number of deities including Ganesha (the remover of obstacles) and Nandi, who is the vehicle and follower of Shiva.  Nandi is said to have played the mridangam during Shiva's primordial tandava dance, causing a divine rhythm to resound across the heavens.  The mridangam is thus also known as "deva vaadyam," or "Divine Instrument".

History
Over the years, the mridangam evolved and was made from different kinds of wood for increased durability, and today, its body is constructed from the wood of the jackfruit tree. It is widely believed that the tabla, the mridangam's Hindustani musical counterpart, was first constructed by splitting a mridangam in half. With the development of the mridangam came the tala (rhythm) system.

The mridangam has a large role in Newa music. One of the earliest Nepal Bhasa manuscripts on music is a treatise on this instrument called Mridanga anukaranam.

The range of its use has changed over the years. In the old days, percussionists were only employed to accompany the lead player, often the vocalist. Now its use is not restricted to accompaniment, and it is used for solo performances.

Tamil culture

In Tamil culture, it is called a tannumai. The earliest mention of the mridangam in Tamil literature is found perhaps in the Sangam literature where the instrument is known as 'tannumai'. In later works, like the Silappadikaram, we find detailed references to it as in the Natyasastra. During the Sangam period, it was one of the principal percussion instruments used to sound the beginning of war, along with the murasu, tudi and parai, because it was believed that its holy sound would deflect enemy arrows and protect the King. During the post-Sangam period, as mentioned in the epic Silappadikaram, it formed a part of the antarakoṭṭu  - a musical ensemble which performed at the beginning of dramatic performances, and that would later develop into Bharathanatyam. The player of this instrument held the title tannumai aruntozhil mutalvan.

Construction

The mridangam is a double-sided drum whose body is usually made using a hollowed piece of jackfruit wood about an inch thick. The two mouths or apertures of the drum are covered with a goatskin and laced to each other with leather straps along the length of the drum. These straps are put into a state of high tension to stretch out the circular membranes on either side of the hull, allowing them to resonate when struck.  These two membranes are dissimilar in diameter to allow for the production of both bass and treble sounds from the same drum.

The bass aperture is known as the thoppi or eda bhaaga and the smaller aperture is known as the valanthalai or bala bhaaga. The smaller membrane, when struck, produces higher pitched sounds with a metallic timbre.  The wider aperture produces lower pitched sounds. The goat skin covering the smaller aperture is anointed in the center with a black disk made of rice flour, ferric oxide powder and starch. This black tuning paste is known as the satham or karanai and gives the mridangam its distinct metallic timbre.

The combination of two inhomogeneous circular membranes allows for the production of unique and distinct harmonics. Pioneering work on the mathematics of these harmonics was done by Nobel Prize-winning physicist C. V. Raman.

Methods of use
Immediately prior to use in a performance, the leather covering the wider aperture is made moist and a spot of paste made from semolina (rawa) and water is applied to the center, which lowers the pitch of the wider membrane and gives it a very powerful resonating bass sound. Nowadays, rubber gum is also used to loosen the membrane helping in creating the bass sound, and its advantage is that unlike semolina, it will not stick on hands. The artist tunes the instrument by varying the tension of the leather straps spanning the hull of the instrument. This is achieved by placing the mridangam upright with its larger side facing down, and then striking the tension-bearing straps located along of circumference of the smaller membrane with a heavy object (such as a stone). A wooden peg is sometimes placed between the stone and the mridangam during the tuning procedure to ensure that the force is exerted at precisely the point where it is needed.  Striking the periphery of the smaller membrane in the direction toward the hull raises the pitch, while striking the periphery from the opposite side (away from the hull) lowers the pitch. The pitch must be uniform and balanced at all points along the circumference of the valanthalai for the sound to resonate perfectly. The pitch can be balanced with the aid of a pitch pipe or a tambura. The larger membrane can also be tuned in a similar manner, though it is not done as frequently. Note that since the leather straps are interwoven between both the smaller and larger aperture, adjusting the tension on one side often can affect the tension on the other.

Posture

The mridangam is played resting it almost parallel to the floor. A right-handed mridangam artist plays the smaller membrane with their right hand and the larger membrane with the left hand.

The mridangam rests above the right ankle (but not on it), the right leg being slightly extended, while the left leg is bent and rests against the hull of the drum and against the torso of the artist. It is extremely important that the two sides of the hips are level, to prevent a habitual lateral pelvic tilt. For a left-handed percussionist, the legs and hands are switched.

It is not uncommon for artists to use stands for the miruthangam so the body is not loaded in an asymmetrical position.

There have recently been reports of gradually altered gait and balance, varying in severity, in those that play the mridangam for long periods of time in asymmetrical positions, especially with poor attention to body posture. Some drums schools do not pay attention to posture and health so it is important to find a school that does so, and to ensure that teachers are experienced and licensed to teach. Additionally, the nature of the drum makes it difficult to avoid a symmetrical position for the two sides of the body. Perhaps, new innovations for the miruthangam will adapt it in such a way that circumvents this issue.
 
Issues caused by asymmetrical body position include functional (not structural) scoliosis, uneven shoulders and hips, and this may cause issues further down limbs, such as the gradual turning in of sole of the right foot to face medially. The asymmetry throughout the body may cause mild balance issues. As well as impairing sporting prowess, it can impair one's ability to maintain good cardiovascular health, leading to the development of associated health conditions. If the body becomes uneven to the point of impairing balance, this too can affect one's daily life. It can also affect one's self image through changing gait and balance – especially in male artists.

It is not known how prevalent the issues are and some artists do not experience any symptoms, although this might be due to an awareness of health and physical appearance not being so significant some countries. Research has yet to be done on the association to physical impairments when the drum is played with a stand.

Musicians should also watch out for uneven shoulder positions when playing the drum, which may be unavoidable. It is recommended that musicians sits completely straight, with hips, spine and shoulders completely even and relaxed. Wooden stands may help alleviate issues with scoliosis, uneven shoulders, hips and its associated issues at the knee and ankles. The impacts can result in difficulty in walking and running efficiently and may cause pain later in life and in old age. Whether strength training and stretching may alleviate these problems is yet to be researched. Therefore, it is strongly advised to notify minors and their parents of issues associated with the drum so that they can make informed decisions on whether to play the drum. When played without adequate care to posture, the miruthangam has the potential to have lifelong effects on one's physical health. Regular stretching, weight training, and sports are advisable but may not prevent impairments.

Western physiotherapists may struggle to comprehend the issues faced because they are unfamiliar with the nature of the drum. Even when the issues are well understood, it is not known whether such long-term changes to the body can be reversed.

Such conditions may be avoided through learning from experienced, licensed teachers.

Research on the miruthangam and postural issues are yet to be done.

Strokes

Basic strokes on the mridangam:

Tha: Non-vibrating tone played on the left-hand side with the whole palm / Non-vibrating tone played on the right-hand side with 3 fingers.
Dhi: Non-vibrating tone played on the center black portion of the right-hand side using middle, ring, and small fingers.
Thom: Vibrating tone played on the outer side of the left-hand side.
Nam: Vibrating tone played on the outer layer of the right-hand side using the index finger, minimizing the black portion vibration with middle or ring finger- place the third finger in the gap in-ring and the second finger hits the outer layer of the right-hand side of the Mrudangam (called 'Saatham').

There is also a parallel set of rhythmic solfa passages (known as "solkattu") which is sounded by mouth to mimic the sounds of the mridangam.  Students of this art are required to learn and vigorously practice both the fingering strokes and solfa passages to achieve proficiency and accuracy in this art.

Advanced strokes:

Many other strokes are also taught as the training becomes more advanced, which are generally used as aesthetic embellishments while playing.  These notes include gumki (or gamakam), and chaapu.  The combination of these finger strokes produces complex mathematical patterns that have both aesthetic and theoretical appeal.  Increasingly complex calculations (kanakku) and metres (nadais) may be employed when the mridangam is played.

Ta: A sharp flat note played with the index finger in the middle of the black portion on the right side of the mridangam.
Gumukki: A variating bass tone produced by playing on the inner layer of the lower end of the left-hand side. Sound is produced only when there is a special applied paste.
Full Chapu: It is a vibrating tone played with the small finger on the right-hand side, between the black patch and the outer layer.  The sound is tuned to the tonic of the tambura.
Ara Chapu: A note similar to Chapu, but is an octave higher, and is played with the side of the hand and less of the pinky.
Dheem: A vibrational tone version of nam played on the black portion of the mridangam.

Classically, training is by dharmic apprenticeship and includes both the yoga of drum construction and an emphasis on the internal discipline of voicing mridangam tone and rhythm both syllabically and linguistically, in accordance with Rigveda, more than on mere performance.

Types of Talam, each with specific angas and aksharas:
Dhruva thaalam
Matya talam
Rupaka talam
Jhampa talam
Ata talam
Eka talam
Triputa talam

Modern usage

Today the mridangam is most widely used in Carnatic music performances.  These performances take place all over Southern India and are now popular all over the world.  As the principal rhythmic accompaniment (pakkavadyam), the mridangam has a place of utmost importance, ensuring all of the other artists are keeping their timing in check while providing support to the main artist.  One of the highlights of a modern Carnatic music concert is the percussion solo (thani avarthanam), where the mridangam artist and other percussionists such as kanjira, morsing, and ghatam vidwans exchange various complex rhythmic patterns, culminating in a grand finale where the main artist resumes where he or she left off.

Mridangam is used as an accompanying instrument in Yakshagana Himmela (orchestra) where it is called the maddale.  However, the mridangam used in Yakshagana is markedly different in structure and acoustics from the ones used in Carnatic music.

Significant players of the mridangam in modern times are T. K. Murthy, Dandamudi Ram Mohan Rao, T. V. Gopalakrishnan, Umayalpuram K. Sivaraman, Vellore G. Ramabhadran, T S Nandakumar, Karaikudi Mani, Trichy Sankaran, Mannargudi Easwaran, Yella Venkateswara Rao, Srimushnam V. Raja Rao,  and Thiruvarur Bakthavathsalam, who have been playing and advancing the technique for decades.

Mridangamela

Mridangamela is a synchronized performance of mridangam by a group of artists. The concept of Mridangamela was developed by Korambu Subrahmanian Namboodiri and is currently propagated by Korambu Vikraman Namboodiri.

Mridangamela is designed to be easily performed and managed even when performed by a group of children. It is common that the age of artists can range from 3 years to above. Most Mridangamelas are performed by children soon after their initiation to learning mridangam. A teaching method developed to train for Mridangamela made this easy to be taught and contributed to its popularity.

In Koodalmanikyam Temple, Irinjalakuda, it is a tradition that Mridangamela is held by children of the age group 3 years and above, as soon as the Utsavam is flagged off. This is performed as an offering to Lord Bharata, who is the deity of Koodalmanikyam Temple.

In 2014, Mridangamela by 75 children was performed at Chembai Sangeetholsavam, which is the annual Carnatic music festival held in Guruvayur by the Guruvayur Devaswom. Mridangamela had been performed at Chembai Sangeetholsavam for the past 35 years orchestrated by Korambu Mridanga Kalari.

Players
Over the years and especially during the early 20th century, great maestros of mridangam also arose, inevitably defining "schools" of mridangam with distinct playing styles.  Examples include the Puddukottai school and the Thanjavur school. The virtuosos Palani Subramaniam Pillai, Palghat Mani Iyer and C.S. Murugabhupathy contributed so much to the art that they are often referred to as the Mridangam Trinity.

Past players

Current players
 T. K. Murthy
 Umayalpuram K Sivaraman
 T. V. Gopalakrishnan 
 Trichy Sankaran
 Guruvayur Dorai
 Karaikudi Mani
 T S Nandakumar
 Yella Venkateswara Rao
 Mannargudi Easwaran
 Thiruvarur Bakthavathsalam
 A. V. Anand
 Varada Rao Kamalakar Rao
 Kamalakar Yogesh
 Dandamudi Sumathi Ram Mohan Rao
 Srimushnam V. Raja Rao
 Patri Satish Kumar
 Anoor Anantha Krishna Sharma
 Trichur C. Narendran
 Tiruvarur Vaidyanathan
 Erickavu N. Sunil
 Bangalore V. Praveen
 H. S. Sudhindra
 A S N Swamy
 Rajna Swaminathan
 TAS Mani
 T N Ramesh
 B Harikumar
 B C Manjunath

See also

Khol
Thavil
Karatalas
Trống cơm – a similar Vietnamese instrument

References

External links
 Rhythmic Syllables article by Mannarkoil J Balaji 
 Rhythmic Descent in Karnatic Music by Mannarkoil J Balaji

Carnatic music instruments
Hand drums
Battle drums
Pitched percussion instruments
Indian musical instruments
Asian percussion instruments